Fashion King is a South Korean manhwa series written and illustrated by Kian84. Started on May 5, 2011, this webtoon manhwa was released on Naver WEBTOON. The print release of the first volume of Fashion King was released in December 2, 2012. The comics have been adapted into a film of the same name.

References

External links
 Fashion King official website on Naver 

Manhwa titles
2011 webtoon debuts
Naver Comics titles
South Korean webtoons
Comedy-drama comics
Fiction about fashion
2013 comics endings
2010s webtoons
Webtoons in print
Comedy webtoons
Drama webtoons
Manhwa adapted into films